The 1991 Men's Asian Basketball Confederation Championship was held in Kobe, Japan.

Preliminary round

Group A

Group B

Group C

Group D

Quarterfinal round

Group I

Group II

Group III

Group IV

Classification 9th–18th

17th place

15th place

13th place

11th place

9th place

Classification 5th–8th

Semifinals

7th place

5th place

Final round

Semifinals

3rd place

Final

Final standing

Awards

References
 Results
 archive.fiba.com

Asia Championship, 1991
Asia Championship, 1991
1991
B
August 1991 sports events in Asia
September 1991 sports events in Asia
Sports competitions in Kobe